Judith Magre (born 20 November 1926) is a French actress, born in Montier-en-Der, Haute-Marne.

Filmography

References

External links
 

1926 births
Living people
French film actresses
French television actresses
French stage actresses
20th-century French actresses
21st-century French actresses
People from Haute-Marne
Signatories of the 1971 Manifesto of the 343